The Regenboldshorn (or Rägeboldshore; 2,193 m) is a mountain of the Bernese Alps, located between Lenk and Adelboden in the canton of Bern. It lies south of the Hahnenmoos Pass, at the foot of the Ammertenspitz (part of the Wildstrubel massif).

The summit of the Regenboldshorn can be reached via marked trails from all sides of the mountain, except for the northeast side, which forms a steep limestone cliff. A chair lift connects Geisbüel (south of Adelboden) to a lower summit on the east named Bummeregrat.

See also
List of mountains of Switzerland accessible by public transport

References

External links
 Regenboldshorn on Hikr

Bernese Alps
Mountains of the Alps
Mountains of the canton of Bern
Mountains of Switzerland
Two-thousanders of Switzerland